Paolo Bertolucci and Adriano Panatta were the defending champions but lost in the first round to Jérôme Potier and Thierry Tulasne.

Ilie Năstase and Yannick Noah won in the final 6–4, 6–4 against Andrew Jarrett and Jonathan Smith.

Seeds
Champion seeds are indicated in bold text while text in italics indicates the round in which those seeds were eliminated.

 Paolo Bertolucci /  Adriano Panatta (first round)
 Ilie Năstase /  Yannick Noah (champions)
 Eric Fromm /  Cary Leeds (quarterfinals)
 Tim Mayotte /  Mark Vines (semifinals)

Draw

External links
 1981 Paris Open Doubles draw

Doubles